The Image Centre (formerly known as the Ryerson Image Centre and the Ryerson Gallery and Research Centre) is an photography and art museum in Toronto, Ontario, Canada. The centre is a university museum operated by Toronto Metropolitan University (TMU), and is housed in a  renovated and remodelled former warehouse building at Gould and Bond Streets on TMU's campus. The centre includes gallery, collections, teaching, research and exhibition spaces and shares the building with the School of Image Arts.

History

The gallery was officially opened on September 29, 2012.

The new building, designed by Toronto architect Donald Schmitt of Diamond and Schmitt Architects contains:
Three public gallery spaces
Glassed in entrance Colonnade that hosts the Salah J. Bachir New Media Wall
A fully staffed professional research centre with museum-quality environmental controls
A climate controlled vault to house the collections, including The Black Star Collection

The centre was in part created to display some of the 292,000 photos from Black Star which it had received as an anonymous donation.

In August 2013, Paul Roth, a former senior curator and director of photography at Corcoran Gallery of Art was appointed as new director of the Ryerson Image Centre. In March 2015, the museum has acquired the archive of Berenice Abbott, which included more than 6,000 photos and 7,000 negatives.

References

External links

Museums in Toronto
Art museums and galleries in Ontario
Toronto Metropolitan University buildings
Photography museums and galleries in Canada
Art museums established in 2012
2012 establishments in Ontario